The Black Door is a South African television drama series created by Mandla N and Mpumelelo Nhlapho. It is an e.tv original production produced by Blackbrain Pictures for e.tv. The series stars Linda Sebezo, Zamani Mbatha, Velephi Mnisi, and Gabisile Tshabalala, among others.

Plot 
The series focuses on Khaya (Zamani Mbatha), a long-distance truck driver who has a dream of owning a bus driving business with his brother, Chuma (Thobani Nzuza). During the day, Chuma is a deacon at church, and at night, he works as a sex worker at The Black Door, an exclusive adult-entertainment brothel. When Khaya learns of his brother's death at the hands of the owner of The Black Door club, Rebecca (Linda Sebezo) over stolen money that was supposed to be delivered, Khaya is forced to join the world of sex, drugs and dodgy dealings to repay the millions his late brother stole. 

Mandla N, one of the executive directors of the series, describes it as more than just full-frontal sex and nudity and says it tells a story of sex workers and their daily lives. The series aims to bring awareness and break stigmas about the profession.

Cast 

 Linda Sebezo as Rebecca
 Zamani Mbatha as Khaya
 Velephi Mnisi as Nomsa
 Sello Ramolahloane as Bra Gibb
 Gabisile Tshabalala as Boniswa
 Kere Nyawo as Stej
 Sandile Dlamini as Mvubu
 Bhekumuzi Mkwanazi as Bra Kenny
 Thobani Nzuza as Chuma
 Mzamo Gcabashe as Romeo
 Sibonginkosi Tenza as Nandi
 Sthembiso SK Khoza as Sabelo Cele 
 Mzikayise Makroti as Nkanyiso
 Oscar Mgudlwa as Jupiter
 Nonkululeko Mbatha as Thenjiwe Sokhulu
 Sibulele Ntlebi as Nolitha Sokhulu
 Siphiwe Nkosi as Frans Mkhize
 Thobani Nzuza as Chuma Sokhulu
 Nolwazi Kweyama as Enhle

Production 
Filming began in February 2022, and although the series is based in Mpumalanga, it was filmed on a farm in Honeydew, outside Johannesburg. The entire set was built from scratch in six weeks. Executive director of the series, Mpumelelo Nhlapho, says that they wanted the sets to feel authentic, and open up the world, adding to the cinematic feel of the series, and also making for more playing areas in their style of filming as compared to the traditional style of telenovelas, which are mostly shot in a studio.

Broadcast 
The series premiered on the 11th of April 2022 on e.tv and repeats on eXposed. The series was also added to the streaming service eVOD.

References 

2020s South African television series
2022 South African television series debuts
South African drama television series